Ak may refer to:

People
 Aytaç Ak, Turkish footballer
 DJ Akademiks, American Twitch streamer
 Orhan Ak, Turkish footballer

Places
 Ak, Buin Zahra, a village in Buin Zahra County, Qazvin Province, Iran
 Ak, Qazvin, a village in Qazvin County, Qazvin Province, Iran
 Ak, Takestan, a village in Takestan County, Qazvin Province, Iran
 Ak Rural District, in Takestan County, Qazvin Province, Iran

Other uses
 Ak language, a Sepik language spoken in Papua New Guinea
 Ak, the Master Woodsman of the World in L. Frank Baum's The Life and Adventures of Santa Claus
 Ak, the nickname for bassist Steve Jay, of the ethno-funk duo Ak & Zuie

See also
 AK (disambiguation)
 Kalashnikov rifle, a Russian rifle

Turkish-language surnames